RAA Tower (formerly Westpac House,  Santos House, BankSA Building, and State Bank Building) is an office building in the South Australian capital of Adelaide. From 1988 until 2019, it was the tallest building in Adelaide. 

It is set back from Currie Street near the intersection with King William Street, and is connected to two adjacent office buildings on Currie Street. It has four street frontages, and several pedestrian thoroughfares. The building was originally known as the State Bank building, and after the 1991 State Bank Collapse it was renamed to reflect the bank's new name, BankSA. It was purchased by Santos and renamed in February 1997. From 2007 to 2022, it was known as Westpac House. In December 2022, RAA purchased naming rights to the tower and Westpac’s signage was removed, with the change to its current name.

History
Opened in 1988 as the State Bank building, it bore BankSA's sturt desert pea logo after the collapse and sale of the bank in 1991. 

In 1997 the naming rights were purchased by Santos and the logo was changed accordingly.

Other major tenants have included PricewaterhouseCoopers, HWL Ebsworth, Institute of Chartered Accountants in Australia and the Australian Securities Exchange. 

In 2007, Santos moved its headquarters into a new building on Flinders Street, and BankSA's new owners, Westpac, re-acquired the naming rights to the building.

In the lead up to (and during) major holidays, the windows have been selectively lit up in formation. These include a white cross for Easter and Anzac Day, and a tree (in fluorescent green) for Christmas.

Abacus Property Group acquired a half interest in Santos House in October 2004 and the remaining 50 per cent in 2015. It sold 50 per cent to Inheritance Capital Asset Management in 2016.

At the time (and for 31 years) the tallest building in Adelaide, it was the venue for the stair race events at the 2007 World Police and Fire Games.

Between 11 and 15 May 2007, the 'Santos' sign on the building was removed and a single red 'W', the Westpac logo, had replaced it by 21 June.

In October 2019, according to the Council on Tall Buildings and Urban Habitat database, Westpac House was the 167th tallest building in Australia.

On 9 December 2022, removal of the red ‘W’ Westpac logo from the building’s fascia commenced, due to Westpac no longer being headquartered there. Removal of the signage began on the western-facing side of the building.

RAA signage is expected to be installed in 2023 as the State's largest membership organisation secured two floors and naming rights of the iconic Adelaide building in late 2022.

See also

 List of tallest buildings in Adelaide

References

Buildings and structures in Adelaide
Skyscrapers in Adelaide
Westpac
Skyscraper office buildings in Australia
Office buildings completed in 1988
Bank buildings in Australia
1998 establishments in Australia